Dejan Petrović (born 3 April 1978) is an Australian-born Serbian tennis coach and former professional tennis player. He played Davis Cup for Serbia and Montenegro.

Career
Petrović made his Grand Slam debut in the 1998 Australian Open, partnering Grant Silcock in the doubles. They were eliminated in the opening round but made it into the second round a year later, at the 1999 Australian Open. In 2002 he reached the second round at the Australian Open and Wimbledon, partnering Todd Perry and then David Škoch.

As a singles player, Petrović made two Australian Open appearances and played once at Wimbledon, but didn't win a match in either event. He
lost four set matches to Leander Paes and Sargis Sargsian in the Australian Opens and lost in straight sets to Martin Damm at Wimbledon.

He was a wildcard entrant in the 2000 AAPT Championships, held in his hometown, Adelaide. After defeating Frenchman Stéphane Huet, Petrović was beaten comfortably by another local, Lleyton Hewitt, who courted controversy when he called the crowd "stupid" for not cheering for him.

Petrović relocated in 2003 to Serbia, where his sister and parents lived. He immediately represented his new country in the Davis Cup, playing doubles with Nenad Zimonjić. The pair would play three matches together in total, winning two of them.

He is now running a tennis academy in the Serbian city of Kragujevac. The most successful player that he has coached is Novak Djokovic, who first starting working with Petrović at the age of 16. Under the mentoring of Petrović, Djokovic went from being ranked outside the top 300 to breaking into the top 100 in less than a year.

Petrović coached Ana Ivanovic until 2015.

Challenger titles

Doubles: (8)

References

External links
 
 Dejan Petrović at the Association of Tennis Professionals Coach Profile
 

1978 births
Living people
Australian male tennis players
Tennis players from Adelaide
Australian people of Serbian descent
Australian expatriate sportspeople in Serbia
Serbian male tennis players
Serbian tennis coaches
Serbia and Montenegro male tennis players
Novak Djokovic coaches